The Iraqi Red Crescent Society was founded in 1932 and it has its headquarters in Baghdad.

See also
 International Red Cross and Red Crescent Movement

External links
 Iraqi Red Crescent Society Profile

Red Cross and Red Crescent national societies
1932 establishments in Iraq
Organizations established in 1932
Medical and health organizations based in Iraq